Crewe Green is a civil parish in Cheshire East, England. It contains 22 buildings that are recorded in the National Heritage List for England as designated listed buildings.  Of these, one is listed at Grade I, the highest grade, two are listed at Grade II*, the middle grade, and the others are at Grade II.  The major feature in the parish is Crewe Hall and its surrounding estate.  Otherwise, apart from the village of Crewe Green, the parish is rural.  Crewe Hall itself and many of the structures associated with it are listed.  Otherwise, the listed buildings consist of houses and cottages, a church, a church hall and a milepost.

Key

Buildings

See also
Listed buildings in Crewe
Listed buildings in Weston
Listed buildings in Barthomley
Listed buildings in Haslington

References
Citations

Sources

 

Listed buildings in the Borough of Cheshire East
Lists of listed buildings in Cheshire